Cody's Wish (born 3 May 2018) is an American Thoroughbred racehorse. He was bred in Kentucky by owner Godolphin Racing. In 2022 he was a winner in four of his five starts–all stakes races–including two Grade I victories in the Forego Stakes at Saratoga and the Breeders' Cup Dirt Mile at Keeneland.

Cody's Wish is named for Cody Dorman, a native of Richmond, Kentucky who was born with Wolf–Hirschhorn syndrome. As a result of the syndrome, Dorman uses a wheelchair and communicates with a tablet. In 2018, while on a visit to Godolphin's Gainsborough Farm in Versailles sponsored by the Make-A-Wish Foundation and Keeneland, Dorman met a young foal by Curlin who immediately interacted with Dorman and laid his head on Dorman's lap. The weanling would later be named Cody's Wish in Dorman's honor. 

Cody's Wish is trained by Bill Mott and was ridden to all four of his 2022 wins by jockey Junior Alvarado.

Background

Cody's Wish's sire is Curlin, the back-to-back recipient of American Horse of the Year honors in 2007 and 2008. The damsire of Cody's Wish is Tapit, consistently among the leading sires in North America, having sired such champions as Untapable, Frosted, Essential Quality and Flightline.

Racing career

2021: three-year-old season

Cody's Wish began his racing career at the age of three. After three third-place finishes at Belmont Park and Saratoga, Cody's Wish broke his maiden in October at Churchill Downs going one mile, with his namesake Cody Dorman in attendance.

Cody's Wish finished the season with two more victories at Churchill in allowance company.

2022: four-year-old season

Cody's Wish's 2022 campaign began with a second-place finish in the Challenger Stakes at Tampa Bay Downs. He was then sent to Belmont Park's Westchester Stakes in May, beating the short 5-horse field by an easy five lengths.

After returning to Churchill to narrowly win the Hanshin Stakes, Cody's Wish was entered in the Grade I Forego Stakes at Saratoga going seven furlongs. After misbehaving in the starting gate, Cody's Wish settled toward the back of the seven-horse field, eventually roused by Junior Alvarado around the turn. He entered the stretch seven wide off the rail and rallied to upset champion Jackie's Warrior, who was softened up after being pressed for the lead, by 1 1/2 lengths.

News of Cody Dorman, and the horse named after him, became more prominent in the period leading up to Cody's Wish's next start in the Breeders' Cup Dirt Mile at Keeneland. When asked about Cody's Wish's chances before the race, Dorman replied "He will win." Cody's Wish started from post 6 in the nine-horse Dirt Mile field, with Dorman allowed to watch the race from the winner's circle. Again breaking slowly and traveling at the rear of the field, Cody's Wish once again rallied while wide on the final turn, eventually passing Cyberknife in the stretch and winning by a head. NBC Sports race caller Larry Collmus summed up the finish with these words: "The wish has come true! That one's for you, Cody!"

Cody's Wish's was named the 2022 winner of the Secretariat Vox Populi Award, which recognizes horses whose racing excellence best resounded with the public. Dorman was awarded with the Big Sport of Turfdom Award by the Thoroughbred Publicists of America, which is given annually to those that enhance coverage of Thoroughbred racing through cooperation with media and racing publicists.

Michael Banahan, director of bloodstock for Godolphin's U.S. operations, confirmed after the Breeders' Cup that Cody's Wish will remain in training for a 2023 campaign.

Statistics

Notes:

An (*) asterisk after the odds means Cody's Wish was the post-time favorite.

Pedigree

References

2018 racehorse births
Racehorses bred in Kentucky
Racehorses trained in the United States
American Grade 1 Stakes winners
Breeders' Cup Dirt Mile winners